
Ehrenfried-Oskar Boege (11 November 1889 – 31 December 1965) was a German general during World War II who held several corps level commands. He was a recipient of the  Knight's Cross of the Iron Cross with Oak Leaves of Nazi Germany.

Boege surrendered to the Soviet forces in May 1945 in the Courland Pocket. Convicted as a war criminal in the Soviet Union, he was held until 1955.

Awards and decorations
 Iron Cross (1914) 2nd Class (30 September 1914) & 1st Class  (6 February 1917)
 Clasp to the Iron Cross (1939) 2nd Class (16 June 1940) &1st Class (16 June 1940)
 German Cross in Gold on 13 January 1943 as Generalmajor and commander of the 197. Infanterie-Division
 Knight's Cross of the Iron Cross with Oak Leaves
 Knight's Cross on 22 December 1941 as Oberst and commander of Infanterie-Regiment 7
 Oak Leaves on 21 September 1944 as General der Infanterie and commander of XXXXIII. Armee-Korps

References

Citations

Bibliography

 
 
 

1889 births
1965 deaths
German Army generals of World War II
Generals of Infantry (Wehrmacht)
People from Ostrów Wielkopolski
People from the Province of Posen
German Army personnel of World War I
Recipients of the clasp to the Iron Cross, 1st class
Recipients of the Gold German Cross
Recipients of the Knight's Cross of the Iron Cross with Oak Leaves
German prisoners of war in World War II held by the Soviet Union
Prussian Army personnel
Reichswehr personnel